The environmental effects of transport are significant because transport is a major user of energy, and burns most of the world's petroleum. This creates air pollution, including nitrous oxides and particulates, and is a significant contributor to global warming through emission of carbon dioxide.
Within the transport sector, road transport is the largest contributor to global warming.

Environmental regulations in developed countries have reduced the individual vehicle's emission.
However, this has been offset by an increase in the number of vehicles, and increased use of each vehicle (an effect known as the Jevons paradox).
Some pathways to reduce the carbon emissions of road vehicles have been considerably studied.
Energy use and emissions vary largely between modes, causing environmentalists to call for a transition from air and road to rail and human-powered transport, and increase transport electrification and energy efficiency.

Other environmental impacts of transport systems include traffic congestion and automobile-oriented urban sprawl, which can consume natural habitat and agricultural lands. By reducing transport emissions globally, it is predicted that there will be significant positive effects on Earth's air quality, acid rain, smog, and climate change. Health effects of transport include noise pollution and carbon monoxide emissions.

While electric cars are being built to cut down CO2 emission at the point of use, an approach that is becoming popular among cities worldwide is to prioritize public transport, bicycles, and pedestrian movement. Redirecting vehicle movement to create 20-minute neighbourhoods that promotes exercise while greatly reducing vehicle dependency and pollution. Some policies are levying a congestion charge to cars for travelling within congested areas during peak time.

Types of effects

Emissions
The transportation sector is a major source of greenhouse gas emissions (GHGs) in the United States.
An estimated 30 percent of national GHGs are directly attributable to transportation—and in some regions, the proportion is even higher.
Transportation methods are the greatest contributing source of GHGs in the U.S., accounting for 47 percent of the net increase in total U.S. emissions since 1990.

Land
Other environmental effects of transport systems include traffic congestion and automobile-oriented urban sprawl, which can consume natural habitat and agricultural lands. By reducing transportation emissions globally, it is predicted that there will be significant positive effects on Earth's air quality, acid rain, smog and climate change.

Health
The health effects of transport emissions are also of concern. A recent survey of the studies on the effect of traffic emissions on pregnancy outcomes has linked exposure to emissions to adverse effects on gestational duration and possibly also intrauterine growth.

As listed above direct effects such as noise pollution and carbon monoxide emissions create direct and harmful effects on the environment, along with indirect effects. The indirect effects are often of higher consequence which leads to the misconception that it's the opposite since it is frequently understood that initial effects cause the most damage. For example, particulates which are the outcome of incomplete combustion done by an internal combustion engine, are not linked with respiratory and cardiovascular problems since they contribute to other factors not only to that specific condition. Even though the environmental effects are usually listed individually there are also cumulative effects. The synergetic consequences of transport activities. They take into account the varied direct and indirect effects on an ecosystem. Climate change is the sum total result of several natural and human-made factors. 15% of global CO2 emissions are attributed to the transport sector.

Mode

The following table compares the emissions of the different transport means for passenger transport in Europe:

Aviation

Aviation emissions vary based on length of flight. Researchers have been raising concern about the globally increasing hypermobility of society, involving frequent and often long-distance air travel and the resulting environmental and climate effects. This threatens to overcome gains made in the efficiency of aircraft and their operations. Climate scientist Kevin Anderson raised concern about the growing effect of air transport on the climate in a paper[13] and a presentation[14] in 2008. He has pointed out that even at a reduced annual rate of increase in UK passenger air travel and with the government's targeted emissions reductions in other energy use sectors, by 2030 aviation would be causing 70% of the UK's allowable  emissions.

Worse, aircraft emissions at stratospheric altitudes have a greater contribution to radiative forcing than do emissions at sea level, due to the effects of several greenhouses gases in the emissions, apart from CO2. The other GHGs include methane (CH4), NOx which leads to ozone [O3], and water vapor. Overall, in 2005 the radiative forcing caused by aviation amounted to 4.9% of all human-caused radiative forcing on Earth's heat balance.

Road transport

Cycling
Cycling has a low carbon-emission and low environmental footprint. 'Cyclists' had 84% lower lifecycle  emissions from all daily travel than 'non-cyclists', and the more people cycled on a daily basis, the lower was their mobility-related carbon footprint. Regular cycling was most strongly associated with reduced life cycle  emissions for commuting and social trips.

Changing from motorised to non-motorised travel behaviour can also have significant effects. A European study of nearly 2000 participants showed that an average person cycling 1 trip/day more and driving 1 trip/day less for 200 days a year would decrease mobility-related lifecycle  emissions by about 0.5 tonnes over a year, representing a substantial share of average per capita  emissions from transport (which are about 1.5 to 2.5 tonnes per year, depending on where you live).

Cars 

Unleaded gasoline has  and diesel has  of CO2 per gallon. CO2 emissions originating from ethanol are disregarded by international agreements however so gasoline containing 10% ethanol would only be considered to produce  of CO2 per gallon.

Buses
Road and transportation conditions vary, so some carbon calculations add 10% to the total distance of the trip to account for potential traffic jams, detours, and pit-stops that may arise.

Rail

Some carbon calculations add 10% to the total trip distance to account for detours, stop-overs, and other issues that may arise.
Electric trains contributes relatively less to the pollution as pollution happens in the power plants which are lot more efficient than diesel driven engines. Generally electric motors even when accounting for transmission losses are more efficient than internal combustion engines with efficiency further improving through recuperative braking.

Infrastructure 
Noise can have a direct effect on the natural environment as a result of railroads. Trains contain many different parts that have the potential to be thundering. Wheels, engines and non-aerodynamic cargo that actually vibrate the tracks can cause resounding sounds. Noise caused from directly neighboring railways has the potential to actually lessen value to property because of the inconveniences that railroads provide because of a close proximity. In order to combat unbearable volumes resulting from railways, US diesel locomotives are required to be quieter than 90 decibels at 25 meters away since 1979. This noise, however, has been shown to be harmless to animals, except for horses who will become skittish, that live near it.

Pollution is another direct result of railroads on the environment. Railroads can make the environment contaminated because of what trains carry. Railway pollution exists in all three states of matter: gaseous, liquid, and solid. Air pollution can occur from boxcars carrying materials such as iron ore, coal, soil, or aggregates and exposing these materials to the air. This can release nitrogen oxide, carbon monoxide, sulphur dioxide, or hydrocarbons into the air. Liquid pollution can come from railways contributing to a runoff into water supplies, like groundwater or rivers and can result from spillage of fuels like oil into water supplies or onto land or discharge of human waste in an unhealthy manner.

Visual Disruption of railroads is defined as a railway changing the way that a previously undisturbed, pristine sight of nature looks. When railways are built in wilderness areas, the environment is visually altered; a viewer will never be able to see the original scene again, and the builders of the railway often alter the landscape around the railway to allow it to ride. Frequent cuttings, embankments, dikes, and stilts are built which will change the way that landscape will look.

An example is the Royal Gorge Bridge in Cañon City, Colorado. This bridge that now uses aerial trams is an unforgettable part of this Colorado landscape

Shipping

Discharges of sewage into water bodies can come from many sources, including wastewater treatment facilities, runoff from livestock operations, and vessels. These discharges have the potential to impair water quality, adversely affecting aquatic environments and increasing the risks to human health. While sewage discharges have potentially wide-ranging effects on all aquatic environments, the effects may be especially problematic in marinas, slow-moving rivers, lakes and other bodies of water with low flushing rates. Environmentally this creates invasive species that often drive other species to their extinction and cause harm to the environment and local businesses.

Emissions from ships have much more significant environmental effects; many ships go internationally from port to port and are not seen for weeks, contributing to air and water pollution on its voyage. Emission of greenhouse gases displaces the amount of gas that allows for UV-rays through the ozone. Sulfur and nitrogen compounds emitted from ship will oxidize in the atmosphere to form sulfate and nitrate. Emissions of nitrogen oxides, carbon monoxide, and volatile organic compounds (VOC) will lead to enhanced surface ozone formation and methane oxidation, depleting the ozone. The effect of the international ship emission on the distribution of chemical compounds such as NOx, CO, O3, •OH, SO2, HNO3, and sulfate is studied using a global chemical transport model (CTM), the Oslo CTM2. In particular, the large-scale distribution and diurnal variation of the oxidants and sulfur compounds are studied interactively. Meteorological data (winds, temperature, precipitation, clouds, etc.) used as input for the CTM calculations are provided by a weather prediction model.

Shipping Emissions Factors:

The road haulage industry is contributing around 20% of the UK's total carbon emissions a year, with only the energy industry having a larger contribution, at around 39%.
Road haulage is a significant consumer of fossil fuels and associated carbon emissions – HGV vehicles account for almost 20 percent of total emissions.

Mitigation of environmental effects

Sustainable transport

Sustainable transport is transport with either lower environmental footprint per passenger, per distance or higher capacity. Typically sustainable transport modes are rail, bicycle and walking.

Road-rail parallel layout

Road-Rail Parallel Layout is a design option to reduce the environmental effects of new transportation routes by locating railway tracks alongside a highway. In 1984 the Paris—Lyon high-speed rail route in France had about 14%  parallel layout with the highway, and in 2002, 70% parallel layout was achieved with the Cologne–Frankfurt high-speed rail line.

Involvement
Mitigation does not entirely involve large-scale changes such as road construction, but everyday people can contribute. Walking, cycling trips, short or non-commute trips, can be an alternate mode of transportation when travelling short or even long distances. A multi-modal trip involving walking, a bus ride, and bicycling may be counted solely as a transit trip. Economic evaluations of transportation investments often ignore the true effects of increased vehicular traffic—incremental parking, traffic accidents, and consumer costs—and the real benefits of alternative modes of transport. Most travel models do not account for the negative effects of additional vehicular traffic that result from roadway capacity expansion and overestimate the economic benefits of urban highway projects. Transportation planning indicators, such as average traffic speeds, congestion delays, and roadway level of service, measure mobility rather than accessibility.

Climate change is a factor that 67% of Europeans consider when choosing where to go on holiday. Specifically, people under the age of 30 are more likely to consider climate implications of travelling to vacation spots. 52% of young Europeans, 37% of people ages 30–64 and 25% of people aged above 65, state that in 2022 they will choose to travel by plane. 27% of young people claim they will travel to a faraway destination.

Europeans expect lifestyle changes to experience great transformation in the next 20 years. 31% of respondents to a climate survey conducted in 2021 believe that most people will no longer own their own vehicle, while 63% believe that teleworking will become the norm to reduce emissions and mitigate the effects of climate change. 48% predict that energy quotas will be individually assigned.

Influence of e-commerce

As large retail corporations in recent years have focused attention on eCommerce, many have begun to offer fast (e.g. 2-day) shipping. These fast shipping options get products and services to the hands of buyers faster than ever before, but have  they are negative externalities on public roads and climate change. A survey in 2016 by UPS shows that 46% of online shoppers abandoned an unused shopping cart due to a shipping time that was way  too long and that 1 and 3 online shoppers look at the speed of delivery from the marketplaces they buy from. Consumers are demanding the fast delivery of goods and services. AlixPartners LLP found that consumers expect to wait an average of 4.8 days for delivery, down from 5.5 days in 2012. And the share of those who are willing to wait more than five days has declined to 60% from 74% in four years.

E-commerce shopping can be seen as the best way to reduce one's carbon footprint. Yet, this is only true to some extent. Shopping online is less energy intensive than driving to a physical store location and then driving back home. This is because shipping can take advantage of economies of scale. However, these benefits are diminished when e-commerce stores package items separately or when customers buy items separately and do not take the time to one stop shop. For large stores with a large online presence, they can have millions of customers opting for these shipping benefits. As a result, they are unintentionally increasing carbon emissions from not consolidating their purchases. Josué Velázquez-Martínez, a sustainable logistics professor at MIT notes that "if you are willing to wait a week for shipping, you just kill 20 trees instead of 100 trees." The only time shipping works in being less energy intensive is when customer do not choose rush delivery, which includes 2-day shipping. M. Sanjayan, the CEO of Conservation International, explains that getting your online purchase delivered at home in just two days puts more polluting vehicles on the road. In addition to standard shipping, consumers must be satisfied with their purchases so that they do not constantly returns items. By returning shipments on standard shipping, the positive contribution to environment is being taken back. In research done by Vox, they found in 2016 transportation overtook power plants as the top prouder of carbon dioxide emissions in the US for the first time since 1979.These environmental issues came from nearly a quarter of transportation trucks that either carry medium and heavy duty loads of merchandise; these trucks are often the ones doing e-commerce shipping.

Since 2009, UPS deliveries have increased by 65%. With the increase in deliveries, there is a demand for trucks on the road, resulting in more carbon emissions in our atmosphere. More recently, there has been research to help combat greenhouse gas emission to the atmosphere with better traffic signals. These WiFi signals cut down on wait time at stop lights and reduce wasting fuel. These signals help automobiles adjust their velocity so that they can  increase their chances of getting through the light, smoothing travel patterns and obtaining fuel-economy benefits. These small adjustments result in big changes in fuel savings. The cities that have started implementing smart light technology such as San Jose, CA and Las Vegas, NV. Light technology has shown to save 15-20% in fuel savings.  According to the United States Environmental Protection Agency, transportation is the second leading source of GHG emission behind electricity and project that by 2050 freight transportation emissions will pass passenger vehicle emissions.  Another technological advancements is truck platooning, trucks are able to send signals to neighboring trucks about their speed. This communication between vehicles reduces congestion on the roads and reduce drag, increasing fuel savings by 10 to 20%.

With these tech implementations in major cities and towns, there is the ability to reach an optimal level of pollution given the rise of e-commerce shipments. The figure above illustrates that decreasing emissions would result in the equilibrium for the market of shipping population, which can be done by consolidating packages, light technology, or truck platooning.

See also

 Bicycle commuting
 Carbon footprint
 Car-free movement
 Circular economy#Automotive industry
 Durability
 Emission intensity
 Environmental effects of transport in Australia
 Externalities of automobiles
 Free public transport
 Health impact of light rail systems
 List of most-polluted cities by particulate matter concentration
 Mobile source air pollution
 Planned obsolescence
 Remote work
 Service life
 Sustainable product
 Throwaway society
 Vehicle recycling

References

External links

Personal Transportation Factsheet by the University of Michigan's Center for Sustainable Systems
 Comparison of CO2 Emissions by Different Modes of Transport by the International Chamber of Shipping

 
Environmental impact by source
Articles containing video clips